List of Hamilton suburbs.

Aberdeen
Ashmore
Bader
Beerescourt
Callum Brae
Chartwell
Chedworth Park
Claudelands
Crawshaw
Deanwell
Dinsdale
Enderley
Fairfield
Fairview Downs
Fitzroy
Flagstaff
Forest Lake
Frankton
Glenview
Grandview Heights
Hamilton Central
Hamilton East
Hamilton Lake
Hamilton North
Hamilton West
Harrowfield
Hillcrest 
Huntington
Livingstone
Magellan Rise
Maeroa
Melville
Nawton
Peacocke
Pukete
Queenwood
River Road
Riverlea
Rotokauri
Rototuna
Ruakura
Silverdale 
Stonebridge
St Andrews
St James Park
St Petersburg
Somerset Heights
Stonebridge
Te Rapa
Te Kowhai
Temple View
Thornton
Western Heights
Whitiora